Otto Joseph Emme (July 3, 1888 - September 26, 1971) served in the California State Assembly for the 66th district from 1923 to 1925 and during World War I he served in the United States Navy Reserve.

References

External links
Family Search Otto Emme

American military personnel of World War I
Members of the California State Legislature
1888 births
1971 deaths